William Albert Jääskeläinen (born 25 July 1998) is a professional footballer who plays for National League club Woking, as a goalkeeper. Born in England, he has represented Finland at youth international level.

Club career

Bolton Wanderers 

Jääskeläinen turned professional with Bolton Wanderers at the start of the 2015–16 season. After being released by the club, he had a trial in August 2017 at VPS in his father's native Finland. On 24 July he signed for Leek Town

Crewe Alexandra 

A month later, he signed for Crewe Alexandra.

During the 2017–18 season, Jääskeläinen went on loan to Loughborough Dynamo, Nantwich Town, Buxton, and Chester.

Jääskeläinen signed a new three-year contract with Crewe in May 2018, but spent much of the 2018–19 season on loan again at Nantwich Town, though a loan extension to the end of the season was cut short when Crewe recalled him on 20 March 2019.

He made his first team debut for Crewe Alexandra on 19 April 2019, keeping a clean sheet, in a 2–0 win over Yeovil Town at Gresty Road. In June 2020, Jääskeläinen signed a new two-year deal with Crewe. Following relegation to League Two, Jääskeläinen was released by the club at the end of the 2021–22 season. Both the club and Jääskeläinen felt that he needed a "fresh challenge".

AFC Wimbledon 

He signed for AFC Wimbledon in September 2022, on a one-month contract, as cover for the injured Nathan Broome. He made his debut for the club in the EFL Trophy victory over Crawley Town and then extended his contract until January 2023. He was released upon the expiry of his contract on 13 January 2023.

Woking
On 4 February 2023, Jääskeläinen signed for National League club Woking.

International career

Jääskeläinen made his debut in international football on 25 August 2015 at the age 17 when he was called to represent Finland under-18s in a match against Montenegro under-18s.

Jääskeläinen has also represented Finland at under-19 youth level. In August 2019, he was called up by Finland Under-21s for two UEFA Euro U21 qualifiers. He was called up again by the under-21s in November 2019.

Personal life
He is the son of former Bolton Wanderers and Finland goalkeeper Jussi Jääskeläinen. His younger brother Emil signed his first professional contract with Blackpool in 2019.

Career statistics

Honours
Crewe Alexandra
 EFL League Two runner-up: 19–20 (promoted)

External links 

 Crewe Alexandra official profile
 William Jääskeläinen – SPL competition record

References

1998 births
Living people
Finnish footballers
Bolton Wanderers F.C. players
Leek Town F.C. players
Crewe Alexandra F.C. players
Loughborough Dynamo F.C. players
Nantwich Town F.C. players
Buxton F.C. players
Chester F.C. players
AFC Wimbledon players
Woking F.C. players
Northern Premier League players
English Football League players
National League (English football) players
Association football goalkeepers
Finland youth international footballers
Footballers from Bolton